Madely Beaugendre (born 22 September 1965 in Pointe-a-Pitre, Guadeloupe) is a French athlete who specialises in the women's high jump. Beaugendre competed at the 1988 Summer Olympics.

Biography 

Madley won four French National Athletic titles in the High Jump: two in Outdoors in 1987 and 1989 and two Indoors in 1987 and 1988.

In 1988, she bettered the  French Indoors record in the High Jump jumping 1.96m.

Palmarès 
French National Outdoors Athletic Championships :
winner of High Jump in 1987 and 1989
French National Indoors Athletic Championships :
winner of High Jump in 1987 and 1988

Records

References 
 sports reference

1965 births
Living people
French female high jumpers
Olympic athletes of France
French people of Guadeloupean descent
Athletes (track and field) at the 1988 Summer Olympics